CAEP may refer to:

Canadian Association of Emergency Physicians 
Chinese Academy of Engineering Physics 
Condom-associated erection problem
Council for the Accreditation of Educator Preparation